Fireball 500 is a 1966 stock car racing film, blended with the beach party film genre.  A vehicle for stars Frankie Avalon, Annette Funicello, and Fabian, it was one of a string of similar racing films from the 1960s. Written by William Asher and Leo Townsend, and directed by William Asher, it tells the story of Dave Owens (Avalon), a stock car racer forced to run moonshine.

Plot
Stock car racer "Fireball" Dave Owens from California goes to race in Spartanburg, South Carolina, where he intends on competing against local champ Sonny Leander Fox. Dave beats Leander in a race, impressing the latter's girlfriend, Jane, and the wealthy Martha Brian.

Martha persuades Dave to drive in a cross country night race, not telling him he is actually smuggling moonshine. She and her partner, Charlie Bigg, are pleased with Dave's results.  Leander, who runs his own still and smuggling operation, is impressed with Dave's success, but this does not change the fact that he wants to beat Dave on the track, even challenging him to a dangerous figure-8 race which ends in a draw.

Agents from the IRS threaten to send Dave to six months in jail unless he helps them bust the local moonshine ring.

After a driver, Joey, is killed during a run, Dave and Leander agree to team up to investigate the accident. They discover it was caused by someone placing a huge mirror across the road. It turns out that Martha's moonshining partner, Charlie Bigg, was solely responsible for the murder of Joey and also tried to kill Dave because he was jealous that the young California driver is sleeping with her.

Dave wins the big race but Leander is badly burned. Jane helps him recover and Dave drives off into the sunset with Martha.

Cast
Frankie Avalon as Dave "Fireball" Owens
Annette Funicello as Jane Harris
Fabian as Sonny Leander Fox
Harvey Lembeck as Charlie Bigg
Chill Wills as Big Jaw Harris
Julie Parrish as Martha Brian
Sandy Reed as Race Announcer
Douglas Henderson as Hastings
Baynes Barron as Bronson
Ed Garner as Herman
Mike Nader as Joey
Vin Scully as The Narrator (prologue)

Production notes
The movie was part of a conscious attempt on AIP to move away from beach party movies, which were losing popularity, and go towards youth rebellion films such as Fireball 500 and The Wild Angels. AIP executive Deke Heyward said that:
The next big thing for teenage films is protest. Teenagers empathize with protest because they are in revolt against their parents... These films represent a protest against society. These will be moral tales, there will be good guys and bad guys. But we will show the reasons for young people going against the dictates of the establishment.
Stock car racing had already been the subject of Red Line 7000 but this movie would be specifically told from the teenagers point of view.

Fabian signed a multi picture deal with AIP in late 1965 and this was the first movie he made for them.

Shooting
The film was shot in early 1966.
The "Fireball 500" is a 1966 Plymouth Barracuda, heavily customized by George Barris, with a 1966 Hemi 426 Plymouth engine that develops up to 425 h.p. At one point in the film, the car is referred to as the Batmobile, prompting Frankie Avalon's character to quip, "Yeah, well this was built first." Barris also built the Batmobile for the Batman television show which premiered in January 1966.

Footage from Fireball 500, specifically shots of the 4B car (Jim Douglas' car) toppling over on its roof, show up later in the demolition derby scenes at the beginning of The Love Bug. When making the film AIP would hire a race car driver and install cameras in the front and rear of his car to obtain shots. The film is notable for its depiction of the inherently dangerous Figure 8 racing.

It was the first movie Funicello made after the birth of her daughter.

Funicello and Fabian starred together again (without Avalon) the following year in AIP's follow-up feature, Thunder Alley.

Music
The film's soundtrack is by Les Baxter, and features six songs written by Guy Hemric and Jerry Styner.  Frankie Avalon sings:
"Fireball 500", 
"My Way" (not to be confused with the song made popular by Frank Sinatra), 
"Turn Around", 
"A Chance Like That", and 
"Country Carnival."
Annette Funicello sings "Step Right Up."

Reception

Critical
Kevin Thomas of the Los Angeles Times said the film "leaves American International's beach formula pretty much intact despite William Asher's attempt to inject some sophistication into his story" but thought it was "always easy to watch" with "a brisk tempo, a stylish verve that leaps over large holes in the story." Bosley Crowther of The New York Times called it "a real turkey... one old bird that should have been cremated, not cooked."

Sequel
In July 1966 it was announced Burt Topper would produce a follow up, Malibu 500 with a budget of $1.4 million. This became Thunder Alley.

References

Further reading
 Leonard Maltin's Movie Guide 2006, p. 428. New York: Penguin/New American Library, 2006.

External links
 
Fireball 500 at Brian's Drive In Theatre

1966 films
1960s sports films
1960s English-language films
American International Pictures films
American auto racing films
Films directed by William Asher
Films scored by Les Baxter
Films set in South Carolina
Films produced by Burt Topper
Beach party films
1960s American films